Roller Girls of the Apocalypse (RGA) is a women's flat track roller derby league based in Kaiserslautern, Germany. Founded in 2009, the league consists of two teams, which compete against teams from other leagues. Roller Girls of the Apocalypse is a member of the Women's Flat Track Derby Association (WFTDA).

History
The league was founded in June 2010 as the K-Town Derby Girls.  The founders were soon joined by three American women who had previous experience of the sport.  While many members work at the town's United States Air Force base, being part of the Kaiserslautern Military Community, the league has also included German, French, Canadian and British members.

The league has played internationally against a variety of opponents and, for example, were the Pirate Brides WupperValley's first opponent. Members of RGA have participated in two German National Championships.

In July 2012, the league was accepted as a member of the Women's Flat Track Derby Association Apprentice Programme, and became a full member of the WFTDA in March 2014.

WFTDA rankings

References

Kaiserslautern
Roller derby leagues established in 2010
Roller derby leagues in Germany
2010 establishments in Germany